was a city located in Tochigi Prefecture, Japan.

As of 2003, the city had an estimated population of 62,517 and a population density of 256.72 persons per km². The total area was 243.52 km².

On March 20, 2006, Imaichi, along with the town of Ashio (from Kamitsuga District), the town of Fujihara, and the village of Kuriyama (both from Shioya District), was merged into the expanded city of Nikkō. Following this merger, the former Imaichi City Hall became the new Nikkō City Hall.

The city was founded on March 31, 1954.

External links
  
 Nikkō official website 

Dissolved municipalities of Tochigi Prefecture
Nikkō, Tochigi